The Carlton Crew is a criminal organisation based in Melbourne, Victoria, Australia, which was formed in the late 1970s and named after the Melbourne suburb in which it is based, Lygon Street, Carlton, commonly called "Little Italy". The organisation was a fierce rival to the Honoured Society and the Calabrese Family, both of which were Calabrian 'Ndrangheta groups also based in Melbourne, and were additionally allies of the mostly Irish Moran family. The Carlton Crew had a strong role in the infamous Melbourne gangland killings.

History
The Carlton Crew included convicted criminals, Mick Gatto, Alphonse Gangitano, Mario Condello and Ron Bongetti and Graham Kinniburgh. Gangitano was arrested several times for minor offences in the late 1970s and early 1980s while building a reputation as "The Black Prince of Lygon Street". Gangitano recruited a score of thugs mainly of Italian origin, who installed jukeboxes and vending machines in local bars and nightclubs under the threat of violence, then reinvested their profits in drug trafficking.

In 1995 Melbourne police suspected Gangitano of two murders, of small-time criminal Greg Workman (killed at Wando Grove, St Kilda East, while celebrating a friend's release from prison) and prostitute Deborah Boundy (whose clients included Carlton Crew hitman Christopher Dale Flannery). Boundy was scheduled to testify in court, but died before the trial from a self-inflicted shot of undiluted heroin believed to have been supplied by Gangitano.

On 15 July 1995, Gangitano engaged in a wild melee with Jason Moran at a Melbourne nightclub. Prosecutors were still debating various charges against him when Gangitano's wife found him dead in the laundry room of their Templestowe home on 16 January 1998; he had been shot several times in the head.

Mick Gatto succeeded Gangitano as head of the group. In June 1999 he was charged with deception for placing 39 bets with a bookie under the pseudonym ('Mick Delgado').  In February 2002 a Royal Commission investigated Gatto on suspicion of accepting A$250,000 to 'mediate' labour disputes with the Australian Workers' Union.

On 13 December 2003 Kinniburgh was murdered outside his home in Kew when he was coming back from the shop getting chocolate ice cream.

Carlton Crew member Mario Condello had a record of convictions for arson, fraud, and drug trafficking. Police also suspected him for multiple murders. In 2005 he was charged with plotting to murder crime boss Carl Williams, who also faced charges of scheming to ambush Condello.  A trial for that case was pending when unknown gunmen murdered Condello outside his Brighton home on 6 February 2006. About 700 people attended his funeral, with Mick Gatto serving as a pallbearer.

Notable members
 1970-2017 Gino (fat Gino) Rosace, Keilor East boss retired in early 2017 from health complications and died from cancer 2017
 Frank Madafferi acting boss 2017 -2019 imprisoned in 2014 for ecstasy pills retired in jail after serving a 10-year prison sentence
 Tony Madafferi current boss 2019–Present after succeeding Gino Rosace from Keilor East as boss in 2017 and succeeding his brother as acting boss Frank in 2019
 Michael The Cowboy Basri underboss 2022–present Oakleigh & Brunswick East crew member
 Tony (The Balls) Menchella Caporegime 1980s-Present Dallas crew member
 David (The Guts) Smith Captain capo and Street boss 1987–Present Dallas crew member
 1984–present John Setka is a lieutenant who was mentored by boss Gino Rosace in construction in the 1980s and is now the Victorian state secretary of the CFMEU - construction division.
 David Setka 2014–present consigliere long time friend of the cowboy Basri
 Paul Faella 2005–Present capo
 Vincenzo Crupi 1970-2022 former underboss of the Carlton crew in Gino's reign and announced retirement in 2022 and was succeeded by the Cowboy Basri as underboss of the Carlton crew and it was Gino's last wishes and also the boss Tony's Maddaferi orders
 Joseph Aquaro 1981-2016 former associate and Captain in Gino's reign his death in 15th March 2016
 1988–present Philip Peters current lieutenant
 2015–present Arthur Peters associate 
 1982-1998 – Alphonse Gangitano – murdered in 1998
 1980-2004 – Mick Gatto – arrested in 2004, retired
 1998–present - Wayne "Donga" Dean - detective and a Sarge, mates with Mick Gatto
 1932-2020 - Kenneth Valletta, retired
 1981-2006 – Mario Condello – arrested in 2005, murdered in 2006
 1980s-2005 - Ron Bongetti - died of natural causes
 1970s–2004 – Lewis Moran – murdered in 2004
 1980s–2000 – Mark Moran – murdered in 2000.
 1980s–2003 – Jason Moran – murdered in 2003.
 1990s–1999 – Carl Williams – shot in the stomach in 1999, murdered in 2010.

See also 
 Crime in Melbourne
 Organised crime in Australia
 The Honoured Society
 Melbourne gangland killings
 Underbelly (TV series)

References

Notes
Newton, Michael (2007). Gangsters Encyclopedia. The World's Most Notorious Mobs, Gangs and Villains, Collins & Brown (C&B)

Organised crime in Melbourne
Organised crime groups in Australia
Italian-Australian culture
Italian-Australian culture in Melbourne